Here and Now is the fourth studio album by American country music singer Darryl Worley, released on November 21, 2006 on 903 Music, owned by country singer Neal McCoy. This album produced two chart singles for Worley on the Hot Country Songs charts: "Nothin' but a Love Thang" at #36, and "I Just Came Back from a War" at #18. The third single, "Living in the Here and Now", reached #54 on the country charts before McCoy announced the closure of 903 Music. "Slow Dancing with a Memory" carried over to Worley's sixth album, Sounds Like Life.

Track listing

Personnel
 Jim "Moose" Brown - Hammond B-3 organ, keyboards, piano, Wurlitzer piano
 Pat Buchanan - electric guitar, slide guitar
 J.T. Corenflos - electric guitar
 Eric Darken - percussion
 Kevin "Swine" Grantt - bass guitar
 Wes Hightower - background vocals
 Tim Lauer - accordion
 B. James Lowry - acoustic guitar, resonator guitar
 Brent Mason - electric guitar
 Greg Morrow - drums
 The Questionnaires - background vocals
 Brent Rowan - 6-string bass guitar, baritone guitar, bass guitar, electric guitar
 Chris Stapleton - background vocals
 Bryan Sutton - banjo, acoustic guitar, national steel guitar, slide guitar
 Darryl Worley - lead vocals

Chart performance

References 

2006 albums
Albums produced by Frank Rogers (record producer)
Darryl Worley albums